Seeing Allred is a 2018 documentary film directed by Roberta Grossman and Sophie Sartain, following women's rights attorney Gloria Allred as she takes on cases of sexual assault allegations concerning some of the most famous people in politics and business. The film was released by Netflix on February 9, 2018.

Premise
Seeing Allred provides a biographical portrait of one of the most public women's rights attorneys, Gloria Allred, through archival footage and interviews with both her supporters and critics.

Cast
 Gloria Allred
 Lisa Bloom
 Bill Cosby
 Roy Moore
 Gloria Steinem

References

External links

 
 
 

2018 documentary films
2018 films
Netflix original documentary films
2010s English-language films